Kim Hoeckele is a multimedia artist living in New York, New York whose mediums include performance art, photography, found objects and video art.

Early life and education
Kim Hoeckele received her B.F.A. in Photography from Georgia State University and received her M.F.A. in studio art from Hunter College in New York, in 2012.

Themes 
Hoeckele's work draws from appropriated images and found objects to construct work that quotes from and reconfigures male-dominant viewpoints carried through literary, art historical, and philosophical works of the Western Canon. Her performance work Rosy-Crimson stemmed from a close reading of the Ancient Greek epic poem The Odyssey. In Rosy-Crimson she appropriates recurring text that omits Odysseus, and rearranges it into a script experimentally performed by actors. In epoch, stage, shell, Hoeckele photographs her body as author and subject to perform sculptural poses for the camera, which are modeled from Greco-Roman ethnographic, art historical, and commercial images.

Selected exhibitions 
2020  (forthcoming) epoch, stage, shell, CONTACT Photography Festival, Toronto, CA 

2019  NADA Miami with Artfare

2019  Crease, Underdonk, Brooklyn, NY

2019  At the Edge of the Universe, 2019 Pingyao Festival of Photography, Pingyao, CN

2019  Digital Déjà Vu, Spectral Lines, Queens, NY

2018  2018 Queens International: Volumes, Queens Museum, Queens NY

2017  Rosy-Crimson, Hercules Art, New York, NY

2016  Rosy-Crimson, Nurture Art, Brooklyn, NY

2014  DIVIDE, Pelham Arts Center, Pelham, NY

2013  For and About, Brooklyn Arts Council, Brooklyn, NY

2013  Amnesic, Family Business, New York, NY

2012  Shifting States, Hockney Gallery, London, UK

2011  Heat Island, SmackMellon Gallery, Brooklyn, NY

2009  MOCA GA Collects: The Photographic Image, MOCA, Atlanta, GA

2007  Kim Hoeckele, Quirk Gallery, Richmond, VA

2004  So Atlanta, Atlanta Contemporary, Atlanta, GA 

2003  Joy Cox and Kim Hoeckele, Saltworks Gallery, Atlanta, GA

Awards and Residencies 
2019  AIM Program, Bronx Museum of the Arts, Bronx, NY

2018  Lower Manhattan Cultural Council Residency, New York, NY

2018  Lighthouse Works Fellowship, Fishers Island, NY

2017  Constance Saltonstall Foundation for the Arts Fellowship Residency, Ithaca, NY

Public collections
Her work is in the permanent collection of the Museum of Contemporary Art of Georgia.

Publications and Interviews
2020  PHROOM Artist Feature, 2020, Web.

2019  “Interview with Kim Hoeckele,” interviewed by conch.fyi, 

2019  Schmidt, Kyra, “Artist Feature: Kim Hoeckele,” Aint-Bad, 

2019  “Tea Salon with Lily Benson and Kim Hoeckele,” interviewed by Elizabeth Smolarz 

2018  Moody, Thomas, “Queens International Continues To Grow,” The Queens Tribune, November 15, 2018. Illus. Print.

2015  a new nothing (in collaboration with Jon-Phillip Sheridan)

2012  Camerona, Sadaf Rassoul and JOFF, “Water,” Capricious Volume II, Issue 13, 2012, 116-118. illus. Print.

2012  Paige, Dominica, “The Unvanquished & the Unknown”, Conveyor Magazine, 2012, 54-57. illus. Print. 

2011  Hegart, Natalie, “Dog Days,” ArtSlant. N.P., July 3. 2011. Web.

2007  Young, Julie. “Art Under Glass,” Richmond Times-Dispatch, June 30, 2001. Print.

2004  Oppenheim, Phil, “Atlanta, Georgia,” Art Papers, September/ October, 40. Print.

2004  Cullum, Jerry, “Home is Where the Art Is,” Atlanta Journal Constitution, April 18. 2004, M3. Print.  

2004  Fox, Catherine, “Focus on Photography,” Atlanta Journal Constitution, January 25, 2004, M3, Illus. Print.

References

External links
 Kim Hoeckele's webpage
 Collection of Kim Hoeckele's works

Living people
21st-century American artists
21st-century American women artists
Georgia State University alumni
Hunter College alumni
Year of birth missing (living people)